PTC Punjabi is a Canadian Punjabi language specialty channel and is owned by Indian politician and president of the Shiromani Akali Dal Sukhbir Singh Badal. It airs news, music, serial, and talk show programming from the Indian network PTC Punjabi as well as local Canadian content produced by Gurbaz Punjabi Media. Local programming consists of live regional and national news, community news & events and a program devoted to new immigrants.

The channel officially launched on April 1, 2011.

Original programming
 Canada Bulletins - daily news bulletins from Canada & Punjab.
 NRI Masle - local issues of interest to Punjabi immigrants
 NRI World - weekly show focusing on news and events from the local Punjabi community
 PTC Showcase - weekly talk show featuring one-on-one interviews with prominent members of the Punjabi-Canadian community

See also
 PTC Punjabi
 PTC News

References

External links
 
 PTC Punjabi

Digital cable television networks in Canada
Television channels and stations established in 2011
Punjabi-language television channels
Mass media in Mississauga
Punjabi-language television in Canada